The Complete Peel Sessions 1978–2004 is a compilation box set by English post-punk band the Fall. It was released in 2005 by record label Castle Music.

Content 
The Complete Peel Sessions comprises each of the twenty-four sessions the group recorded for John Peel's radio show. Peel was an avid supporter of the group from early in their career, and the Fall recorded more sessions for Peel's programmes than any other artist. The set was in the process of being compiled when Peel died in October 2004. The set charts almost all of the group's musical phases up until 2004.

Release 
The box set's release was conceived by Sanctuary Records as part of a comprehensive reissue campaign to capitalise upon the recent success of The Real New Fall LP (Formerly Country on the Click), which had been roundly praised as a "return to form" for the band. In 2004, Sanctuary issued expanded, remastered editions of the band's first four albums—Live at the Witch Trials (1979), Dragnet (1979), the (mostly) live Totale's Turns (1980), and Grotesque (After the Gramme) (1980)—as well as the first career-spanning "greatest hits" compilation, 50,000 Fall Fans Can't Be Wrong. The release of The Complete Peel Sessions was slated for summer 2005 to arrive alongside another "deluxe" reissue of the band's acclaimed fourth studio album, Hex Enduction Hour (1982).

Reception 

The Complete Peel Sessions was met with a laudatory response from critics, who generally praised it as a worthy summation of the Fall's career to date. Critics named a broad selection of highlights, though some noted an impression of inconsistency or decline in the latter portions of its seven-hour runtime. "There are now more Fall compilations and collections out there than Mark E. Smith himself can keep track of," Nigel Kendall wrote for The Times, "but if you buy only one, make it this one." Named the "Reissue of the Week" in NME, the compilation was reviewed by Rob Fitzpatrick, who said:

In the Daily Mirror, Gavin Martin called it a "lavish, head-spinning portrait of the most undervalued band in Britain" and "confirmation of Mark E. Smith as Britrock's great anti-hero". Keith Bruce of The Herald recommended the box set for diehard fans of the Fall, who he surmised would likely focus on recordings dating to either the early 1980s period with Marc Riley or Brix Smith's time with the band the mid-1980s—although  real anoraks," Bruce continued, "will be able to be more specific about a band that has had 30 different line ups over more than 25 years." Simon Goddard for Uncut said that the "bulk" of the BBC recordings "easily rival" the studio versions of the tracks, while a few "actually surpass" them. Although Goddard felt the set's overall range in quality was "desperately eclectic, even by the Fall's abstruse standards", it was nonetheless "hard to imagine a more satisfying or comprehensive career overview than this." At Mojo, Ian Harrison wrote it "may well be the definitive history of the Fall, from wired, punk-era beginnings on to year after year of constant mutation", noting the superiority of many of the Peel recordings to the studio versions of the same songs, and though he detected the band decline throughout the 1990s, he still found the release to be "indispensable for the fan, and a superb introduction for those wanting to be infected."

At Pitchfork, Joe Tangari wrote that the box set arguably represented "the definitive look at the Fall's career to date—even more than last year's very well-considered 50,000 Fall Fans Can't Be Wrong compilation"; however, noting its considerable length, he said "it's not the place to start, but anyone with more than four or five Fall albums would be doing themselves a huge service picking this up." Per David Jeffries at AllMusic, the immediacy of the Peel sessions format curtailed Smith's typically "flippant attitude toward practically everything" and his band's tendency to meander in a studio setting—but when recorded live and under conditions of imposed brevity, they demonstrated "an urgency and drive that's woefully absent from all but the band's best albums". The sheer quantity of highlights found on the box set, Jeffries continued, placed it "next to 50,000 Fall Fans and This Nation's Saving Grace in the Fall 'Hall of Fame.'" In a more reserved review, Entertainment Weeklys Tom Sinclair cautioned that the Fall were "a notoriously acquired taste" and  alternative to alternative", the recordings "lurch, rattle, crawl, clatter, stagger—and sometimes even rock."

Praise for individual tracks
Among the 97 total tracks on The Complete Peel Sessions, the following were cited as highlights of the set by at least one critic from the aforementioned reviews:

Accolades
The Complete Peel Sessions won Catalogue Release of the Year at the 2005 Mojo Awards, in a ceremony held at London's Porchester Hall on 16 June 2005. The award, sponsored by music retailer HMV, was intended to recognize the "reissue that is both definitive and beautifully packaged" from the preceding year. The Complete Peel Sessions bested other nominated releases from the Clash, Jeff Buckley, the Mamas & the Papas, the Kinks and Jack Nitzsche.

The Complete Peel Sessions appeared on several critics' year-end lists for 2005. In a feature by Stewart Lee, The Sunday Times named it the third-best record of 2005. David Fricke of Rolling Stone ranked the compilation eighth on the magazine's list of the year's top 10 reissues. The Sun critic Simon Cosyns named it among the year's 11 best box sets on a list that was unranked aside from the top spot, designated for Blue Guitars by Chris Rea.

Meanwhile, in early 2006 the record industry periodical Music Week commended Will Nicol and Steve Hammonds of Sanctuary Records for conducting one of the year's most effective marketing campaigns based on promotion of an established musical act's back catalogue. Music Week named the campaign for The Complete Peel Sessions among four finalists for the year's best "catalogue campaign", with Sony BMG's promotion of the Elvis Presley compilation #1 Singles claiming the top spot.

Track listing 
Some tracks appear under titles different from those attached to their studio incarnations. Although most differences are slight, the tracks are listed by the titles they were given at the relevant session.

Disc one

Disc two

Disc three

Disc four

Disc five

Disc six

Personnel 

 Session 1, 30 May 1978

 Mark E. Smith – vocals
 Martin Bramah – guitar, bass guitar, backing vocals
 Yvonne Pawlett – keyboards
 Karl Burns – drums
 Steve Davies – congas
 Tony Wilson – production
 Mike Robinson – engineering

 Session 2, 27 November 1978

 Mark E. Smith – vocals
 Martin Brahah – guitar, bass guitar, backing vocals
 Marc Riley – bass guitar
 Yvonne Pawlett – keyboards
 Karl Burns – drums
 Bob Sargeant – production
 Brian Tuck – engineering 
 Dave Dade – engineering

 Session 3, 24 September 1980

 Mark E. Smith – vocals, keyboards, kazoo, guitar
 Marc Riley – guitar, keyboards, backing vocals
 Craig Scanlon – guitar, backing vocals
 Steve Hanley – bass guitar
 Paul Hanley – drums
 John Sparrow – production

 Session 4, 24 March 1981

 Mark E. Smith – vocals
 Marc Riley – keyboards, guitar, backing vocals
 Craig Scanlon – guitar, backing vocals
 Steve Hanley – bass
 Paul Hanley – drums
 Dave Tucker – clarinet
 Dale Griffin – production
 Martyn Parker – engineering

 Session 5, 15 September 1981

 Mark E. Smith – vocals, tapes
 Marc Riley – guitar, keyboards
 Craig Scanlon – guitar
 Steve Hanley – bass, toy guitar, voice
 Paul Hanley – drums
 Dale Griffin – production
 Nick Gomm – engineering

 Session 6, 21 March 1983

 Mark E. Smith – vocals, keyboards
 Craig Scanlon – guitar, backing vocals
 Steve Hanley – bass, backing vocals
 Paul Hanley – drums, backing vocals
 Karl Burns – drums, bass, backing vocals
 John Porter – production
 Dave Dade – engineering

 Session 7, 12 December 1983

 Mark E. Smith – vocals, tapes
 Craig Scanlon – guitar
 Brix Smith – guitar, vocals
 Steve Hanley – bass
 Paul Hanley – drums, keyboards
 Karl Burns – drums, bass
 Tony Wilson – production
 Martin Colley – engineering

 Session 8, 14 May 1985

 Mark E. Smith – vocals
 Craig Scanlon – guitar
 Brix Smith – guitar, vocals
 Steve Hanley – bass
 Simon Rogers – guitar, keyboards
 Karl Burns – drums
 Mark Radcliffe – production
 Mike Walter – engineering

 Session 9, 29 September 1985

 Mark E. Smith – vocals
 Craig Scanlon – guitar
 Brix Smith – guitar, keyboards, vocals
 Steve Hanley – bass, xylophone
 Simon Rogers – guitar, keyboards
 Karl Burns – drums
 Dale Griffin – production
 Mike Engles – engineering

 Session 10, 29 June 1986

 Mark E. Smith – vocals
 Craig Scanlon – guitar, backing vocals
 Brix Smith – guitar, backing vocals
 Steve Hanley – bass, backing vocals
 Simon Rogers – guitar, keyboards
 Simon Wolstencroft – drums
 Dale Griffin – production
 Mike Engles – engineering

 Session 11, 28 April 1987

 Mark E. Smith – vocals
 Craig Scanlon – guitar
 Brix Smith – guitar, vocals
 Steve Hanley – bass, backing vocals
 Simon Rogers – keyboards, guitar
 Simon Wolstencroft – drums
 Production details unknown

 Session 12, 25 October 1988

 Mark E. Smith – vocals, tapes
 Craig Scanlon – guitar
 Brix Smith – guitar, backing vocals
 Steve Hanley – bass
 Marcia Schofield – keyboards, backing vocals
 Simon Wolstencroft – drums
 Mike Robinson – production, engineering

 Session 13, 17 December 1989

 Mark E. Smith – vocals
 Craig Scanlon – guitar
 Martin Bramah – guitar
 Steve Hanley – bass
 Marcia Schofield – keyboards, backing vocals
 Simon Wolstencroft – drums
 Kenny Brady – fiddle
 Dale Griffin – production
 Mike Engles – engineering

 Session 14, 5 March 1991

 Mark E. Smith – vocals
 Craig Scanlon – guitar
 Steve Hanley – bass
 Simon Wolstencroft – drums
 Kenny Brady – fiddle
 Mike Robinson – production, engineering

 Session 15, 19 January 1992

 Mark E. Smith – vocals, tapes
 Craig Scanlon – guitar
 Steve Hanley – bass
 Dave Bush – keyboards
 Simon Wolstencroft – drums
 Dale Griffin – production
 James Birtwistle – engineering
 Mike Engles – engineering

 Session 16, 28 February 1993

 Mark E. Smith – vocals
 Craig Scanlon – guitar
 Steve Hanley – bass
 Dave Bush – keyboards
 Simon Wolstencroft – drums
 Mike Robinson – production
 James Birtwistle – engineering

 Session 17, 2 December 1993

 Mark E. Smith – vocals
 Craig Scanlon – guitar
 Steve Hanley – bass
 Dave Bush – keyboards
 Simon Wolstencroft – drums
 Nick Gomm – production
 Paul Long – engineering

 Session 18, 20 November 1994

 Mark E. Smith – vocals
 Craig Scanlon – guitar
 Brix Smith – guitar, vocals
 Steve Hanley – bass
 Dave Bush – keyboards
 Simon Wolstencroft – drums
 Karl Burns – drums
 James Birtwistle – production
 Paul Allen – engineering

 Session 19, 7 December 1995

 Mark E. Smith – vocals
 Brix Smith – guitar, vocals
 Julia Nagle – keyboards, guitar
 Steve Hanley – bass
 Simon Wolstencroft – drums
 Karl Burns – drums
 Lucy Rimmer – vocals
 Nick Gomm – production
 Adam Askew – engineering

 Session 20, 30 June 1996

 Mark E. Smith – vocals
 Brix Smith – guitar, vocals
 Julia Nagle – keyboards, guitar
 Steve Hanley – bass
 Simon Wolstencroft – drums
 Karl Burns – drums
 Ted de Bono – production
 Lisa Softley – engineering

 Session 21, 3 February 1998

 Mark E. Smith – vocals, guitar
 Julia Nagle – guitar, keyboards, backing vocals
 Steve Hanley – bass
 Karl Burns – drums, backing vocals
 John Rolleson - backing vocals
 Mike Robinson – production
 Nick Scripps – engineering

 Session 22, 18 October 1998

 Mark E. Smith – vocals
 Julia Nagle – guitar, keyboards
 Neville Wilding - guitar 
 Karen Leatham - bass
 Tom Head – drums
 Elspeth Hughes – special effects
 Mike Engels – production
 Kevin Rumble – engineering

 Session 23, 19 February 2003

 Mark E. Smith – vocals
 Ben Pritchard – guitar, backing vocals
 Jim Watts – bass guitar, backing vocals
 Elena Poulou – keyboards, backing vocals
 Dave Milner – drums, backing vocals
 Mick Middles – backing vocals
 Louise Kattenhorn – production
 Mike Walter – engineering

 Session 24, 4 August 2004

 Mark E. Smith – vocals, percussion
 Ben Pritchard – guitar, backing vocals
 Jim Watts – guitar, bass guitar
 Elena Poulou – keyboards, backing vocals
 Steve Trafford – bass guitar, guitar
 Spencer Birtwistle – drums
 Ed Blaney – guitar
 Jerry Smith – production
 Nick Fountain – engineering

Notes

References

External links 
  via Sanctuary Records
 

Peel Sessions recordings
The Fall (band) compilation albums
2005 live albums
2005 compilation albums
Albums produced by Bob Sargeant